Attock Passenger is a passenger train operated daily by Pakistan Railways between Mari Indus and Attock.

Route 
 Mari Indus–Attock City Junction via Kotri–Attock Railway Line

Station stops

Equipment 
Attock Passenger only offers economy class seating.

References 

Named passenger trains of Pakistan
Passenger trains in Pakistan